Charles Atkinson (17 December 1932 – 25 November 2010) was an English professional footballer who played as a wing half.

Career
Born in Hull, Atkinson played for Marist Old Boys, Hull City, Bradford Park Avenue and Bradford City. He was a wing-half. Atkinson played for his hometown club before he joined Bradford Park Avenue's where he became their record Football League appearance holder. He finished his professional playing career with their wool city rivals Bradford City, before playing for Real Santos in Bradford.

Atkinson became president of Park Avenue before he retired due to ill-health in 2007.

Personal life
Atkinson also had trials for Yorkshire at cricket.

He lived in Pudsey. He died on 25 November 2010 at the age of 77 from ill-health following a previous fall when he cracked his skull and had to have a brain operation.

References

1932 births
2010 deaths
English footballers
Association football wing halves
Hull City A.F.C. players
Bradford (Park Avenue) A.F.C. players
Bradford City A.F.C. players
English Football League players
Sportspeople from Pudsey